Coleophora tolensis is a moth of the family Coleophoridae. It is found in Mongolia.

References

tolensis
Moths of Asia